The 1902–03  season was the 18th since the foundation of Southampton F.C. and their ninth in league football, as members of the Southern League, of which the club won their fifth title.

Squad

Southern Football League Division One

References

 

Southampton F.C. seasons
Southampton